Charles Franklin Sarratt (October 22, 1923 – June 3, 2018) was an American football end who played one season with the Detroit Lions. He played college football at the University of Oklahoma, having previously attended Belton High School in Belton, South Carolina.

References

1923 births
2018 deaths
American football quarterbacks
Detroit Lions players
Oklahoma Sooners football players
Players of American football from South Carolina
Sportspeople from Greenville, South Carolina